Victor R. "Vic" Smith is a former football (soccer) player who represented New Zealand at international level.

Smith made his full All Whites debut in a 0–6 loss to South Africa on 5 July 1947  and ended his international playing career with six A-international caps to his credit, his final cap an appearance in a 0–4 loss to Australia on 4 September 1948.

Three of his brothers also represented New Zealand, Gordon Smith and Roger Smith playing official international appearances, while the third brother, Jack Smith, only played in unofficial matches. Ryan Nelsen, grandson of another brother, Bob Smith, also played for New Zealand

References 

Year of birth missing (living people)
Living people
New Zealand association footballers
New Zealand international footballers
Association football midfielders